Cəlilabad (also, Astrakhanka, Astrakhan-Bazar until 1967 ) is a city in and the capital of the Jalilabad District of Azerbaijan.  The city is named after Jalil Mammadguluzadeh.

Gallery

References 

World Gazetteer: Azerbaijan – World-Gazetteer.com
http://jalilabad.org – Cəlilabad

Populated places in Jalilabad District (Azerbaijan)